Jóna Margrét Ragnarsdóttir (born 29 March 1983) is an Icelandic former handball player and a former member of the Icelandic national handball team.

References

1983 births
Living people
Jona Margret Ragnarsdottir